Micronations: The Lonely Planet Guide to Home-Made Nations is a gazetteer published by Lonely Planet.  It has also been published under the name Micronations: The Lonely Planet Guide to Self-Proclaimed Nations. It was written by John Ryan, George Dunford and Simon Sellars.

Micronations featured
The book's profile of micronations offers information on their flags, leaders, currencies, date of foundation, maps and other facts. Sidebars throughout the book provide overviews of such topics as coins and stamps and a profile of Emperor Norton.

Micronations featured in the book include:

 
 
  Principality of Hutt River
  Kingdom of Lovely
  Whangamomona
  Gay and Lesbian Kingdom of the Coral Sea Islands
 
 
 
 
 
 
 
  Great Republic of Rough and Ready
 
 
 
 
  North Dumpling Island
  Republic of Kugelmugel
  Lagoan Isles
  Vikesland
 
  Romkerhall
  Ibrosia
 
  Talossa
  Aerica
 
  Trumania
  Kingdom of Redonda
  Westarctica
 
 
  Rathnelly
 
 
 
 
  Le Royaume de L'Anse-Saint-Jean
  Ladonia
  Dominion of British West Florida
  Elsanor
  Principality of Snake Hill

See also
 List of micronations
 Flags of micronations
 Micronations and the Search for Sovereignty
 How to Start Your Own Country

References

Further reading 

Gazetteers
2006 non-fiction books
Works about micronations